Judith Vittet is a French actress who played "Miette" in La Cité des enfants perdus (English: The City of Lost Children) (1995).

Prior to her role as Miette, Vittet played Lili in Personne ne m'aime (1994). She also had roles in Nelly et Monsieur Arnaud (1995) and K (1997).

External links

French film actresses
French child actresses
Living people
1984 births
Place of birth missing (living people)
20th-century French actresses